Rebecca Kislak (born March 7, 1972) is an American attorney and politician serving as a member of the Rhode Island House of Representatives from the 4th district. Kislak was elected in November 2018 and assumed office on January 1, 2019.

Education 
Kislak earned a Bachelor of Arts degree in ancient studies from Brown University and a Juris Doctor from the Georgetown University Law Center.

Career 
Prior to serving in the House, Kislak worked as a lawyer in Worcester, Massachusetts and Providence, Rhode Island. Kislak has also worked as an advocate for children's advocate and healthcare policy advisor. Kislak was elected to the Rhode Island House in 2018 and assumed office in 2019. In the 2020 Democratic Party presidential primaries, Kislak endorsed Elizabeth Warren.

Personal life 
Kislak and her wife, Joanna Brown, have two children.

References 

Living people
1972 births
Brown University alumni
Georgetown University Law Center alumni
Democratic Party members of the Rhode Island House of Representatives
Women state legislators in Rhode Island
LGBT state legislators in Rhode Island
21st-century American politicians
21st-century American women politicians